XHXF-FM is a radio station on 103.1 FM in León, Guanajuato. XHXF is owned by Grupo ACIR and carries its 103.1 FM romantic format.

History
XHXF began as XEXF-AM 1140. It received its first concession on April 15, 1964 and operated as a daytimer owned by Gustavo Montes Robles and transmitting from Romita. In 1977, Montes Robles sold XEXF to Radio Bajío, S.A., and in the 2000s, under ACIR, it began broadcasting at night.

XEXF migrated to FM after being authorized to do so in 2011.

References

Radio stations in Guanajuato
Radio stations established in 1964
Grupo ACIR